The Anderson School near Gallatin Gateway, Montana was built in 1916.  It was listed on the National Register of Historic Places in 1981.

It is a square, hipped roof, one-story frame schoolhouse with clapboard siding, on a concrete foundation.  It has elements of bungalow style and its design "very closely resembles plan C-3 from W.R. Plew's bulletin on school house design published in 1919."

A long frame stable to the west of the building is a second contributing building in the listing.

References

Schools in Gallatin County, Montana
National Register of Historic Places in Gallatin County, Montana
School buildings completed in 1916
1916 establishments in Montana
School buildings on the National Register of Historic Places in Montana
Bungalow architecture in Montana
American Craftsman architecture in Montana